Tapiraí is a municipality in the state of São Paulo in Brazil. It is part of the Metropolitan Region of Sorocaba. The population is 7,766 (2020 est.) in an area of 755.10 km². The elevation is 875 m. The city is located in a UNESCO Biosphere Reserve (UNESCO 1992). There are many natural touristic attractions available to tourists during the summer and during the winter the city turns into an escape from the busy days and nights of the big cities surrounding Tapiraí. Tourism in the city is still in a development phase, however, the city already counts with a tourist office and companies specialized in adventure sports like rafting and canoeing.

The municipality contains part of the  Serra do Mar Environmental Protection Area, created in 1984.

References

Municipalities in São Paulo (state)